Alan Benedict Lee Hernandez Casiño (born May 14, 1993), popularly known as Albie Casiño, is a Filipino actor best known for his role as Christian in the 2010 hit series, Mara Clara.

Personal life
Casiño was involved in a controversy with ex-girlfriend Andi Eigenmann. Eigenmann was reportedly almost five months pregnant on June 29, 2011. She then revealed that the father of her child was her "first" boyfriend, and Albie was one of the suspects.

Meanwhile, Eigenmann's present boyfriend, Jake Ejercito already denied that he is the father while Albie's mother neither confirmed nor denied that Albie is the father of Andi's unborn child. However, in an interview of Eigenmann's father, Mark Gil, he did hint that the father of the child is Eigenmann's first and only boyfriend; he also said that Ejercito was not the father and he respected him for being there, even if he was not the father of the child.
Eventually, after a 5-year dispute, in September 2016, it was finally confirmed by Eigenmanns's sister in a podcast, that Jake Ejercito, is the confirmed father, and that a paternity test was taken, without Casiño's knowledge.

In August 2015, Casiño revealed his battle with attention deficit hyperactivity disorder or ADHD, citing it as a reason for his departure from ABS-CBN.

Casiño entered the Pinoy Big Brother (PBB) house in the 2021 Celebrity edition of the reality show, and has opened up about his struggles with ADHD which resulted to his altercation with fellow housemate Alexa Ilacad. The tension around his reclusive personality eventually lead to his eviction from the said show.

Nevertheless, he has since reconciled with fellow PBB housemates, and has openly expressed interest to bury the hatchet with Andi Eigenmann.

Bar altercation and assault
On May 4, 2012, Gene saw Casiño at a bar in Makati and reportedly threw wine on Casiño's face and slapped him. Casiño went to the restroom "to clean himself up" with the intention of leaving the bar after but he and a friend were purportedly followed and assaulted in the parking lot by Eigenmann's companions. The commotion was later stopped by a bouncer. Gene's companions included Frank Magalona, son of late rapper Francis Magalona, and Jeck-Jeck Lacson, son of politician Ping Lacson.

Filmography

Television

Film

Awards

References

External links
 

1993 births
Living people
De La Salle–College of Saint Benilde alumni
People from Makati
Male actors from Metro Manila
Star Magic
Filipino male models
21st-century Filipino male actors
Pinoy Big Brother contestants